No. 544 Squadron RAF was a Royal Air Force Squadron formed as a photographic reconnaissance squadron in World War II.

History
The squadron formed at RAF Benson on 19 October 1942 and was equipped with Ansons, a detachment then went to Gibraltar where it operated Wellingtons.  It then operated Spitfires and Mosquitos on reconnaissance missions, including Aarhus five days before the air raid on 31 October 1944. It disbanded on 13 August 1945 after hostilities ceased.

Aircraft operated

References

External links

 Squadron history (and more) on RafWeb
 Squadron history on the official RAF website

544
Aircraft squadrons of the Royal Air Force in World War II
544
Military units and formations established in 1942
Military units and formations established in 1945